ETSI may refer to:

 European Telecommunications Standards Institute
 ICAO code of Ingolstadt Manching Airport

See also
Etsi multa, Etsi Nos, and Etsi de statu, various papal encyclicals or papal bulls
ETS1